Santiago Pozo is a Spanish-American film producer, writer, director, and marketing executive. In 1988, he founded Arenas Entertainment, LLC.

Life
Pozo was born in Santo Domingo de la Calzada, La Rioja, Spain. He grew up in Madrid where his father was a baker. As a teenager, he became interested in filmmaking and eventually found a directing job with the producer Elias Querejeta.

Career
Since the early 1980s, Pozo has been involved in the Marketing and distribution of films. His book "La Industria Cinematografica en España" was published by the University Of Barcelona 1984.  In 1983, he moved to Los Angeles where he was working as a janitor cleaning buildings. He was then retained as an assistant by Jose Luis Borau, a Spanish filmmaker, in pre-production of the feature film "On The Line". 
In 1984, having received a Fulbright scholarship from the Spanish-North American committee, Pozo enrolled in the Peter Stark producing program at The University of Southern California. In 1985, he took an internship at Universal Studios and with his enthusiasm for supplying the Hispanic market, was employed at the studios as director of special markets.

Arenas Group
In 1987, Pozo resigned from Universal Studios and founded Arenas Group, a film marketing company By 1997, Pozo was using the '360' marketing method, where a brand is presented to the customer at all points of contact.

Arenas Entertainment
In 2001, Pozo founded Arenas Entertainment, a studio to produce and distribute Latino films to the Hispanic market in the US. He received support from Marco Polo, a Spanish risk and capital management firm, and from Marc Shmuger, the vice chairman Universal Pictures. In 2002, Pozo's company was engaged to make the international distribution of Empire. In the same year, Pozo produced Imagining Argentina. In 2004, Pozo distributed the film, Nicotina. Pozo's partnership with Universal Pictures finished but continued with Marco Polo.

Community
In 2001, Pozo successfully lobbied the City of Los Angeles to add the Spanish language tilde (Ñ)
to street signs where required.

Producer
 The Last Harvest (1991) (executive producer)
 Empire (2002)
 Imagining Argentina (2003)
 Culture Clash in AmeriCCa (2005) (executive producer)

Director
 Los Primeros Metros (1980)

Writer
 Los Primeros Metros (1980), producer Elias Querejeta.

References

External links
 
 "Arenas Group". Company website. Accessed 22 December 2013.

American chief executives
American film producers
American film studio executives
Living people
USC School of Cinematic Arts alumni
Year of birth missing (living people)